A Jewish newspaper is a newspaper which focuses on topics of special interest to Jews, although Jewish newspapers also include articles on topics of a more general interest as well. Political orientations and religious orientations cover a wide range.

This list includes dailies, weeklies, and papers of other frequencies. It includes newspapers in Hebrew, Yiddish, and a variety of other languages. It includes defunct as well as active publications.

References

 

Jewish